Tijani Moro (born 8 May 1978) is a Ghanaian boxer. He represented Ghana at the 1994 Commonwealth Games, where he won a bronze medal.

External links
 
 

1978 births
Living people
Ghanaian male boxers
Welterweight boxers
Commonwealth Games bronze medallists for Ghana
Commonwealth Games medallists in boxing
Boxers at the 1994 Commonwealth Games
Place of birth missing (living people)
Medallists at the 1994 Commonwealth Games